Catherine Doléans-Dade (24 January 1942 – 19 September 2004) was a French American mathematician. She made significant contributions to the calculus of martingales, including a general change of variables formula, a theorem on stochastic differential equations, and exponential processes of semimartingales.

After earning her doctorate from the University of Strasbourg in 1970, she became a professor in the Mathematics Department of the University of Illinois at Urbana–Champaign. She died of cancer in 2004.

References 

1942 births
2004 deaths
French mathematicians
University of Strasbourg alumni
University of Illinois Urbana-Champaign faculty
French emigrants to the United States